Wayne Lai Yiu-cheung (born 4 May 1964) is a Hong Kong actor. He became one of Hong Kong's most successful television actors after starring in TVB hit drama series Rosy Business. Lai won three TVB Anniversary Awards for Best Actor, making him only one of three actors who have three wins in that category.

After graduating from TVB artistes' training program, he made his acting debut in 1986, playing supporting roles. He first rose to popularity for his role as Zhu Bajie in the 1996 fantasy drama Journey to the West. In 2008, he won Best Supporting Actor at the TVB Anniversary Awards for his role in The Gentle Crackdown II. His performance as Chai Kau in the period drama Rosy Business received critical acclaim and earned him the TVB Anniversary Award for Best Actor. Lai again won Best Actor at the TVB Anniversary Awards for starring in No Regrets (2010) and The Confidant (2012).

Life and career 
Lai was born in Hong Kong and the youngest in his family. His father was a firefighter. When Lai's father retired, his family moved to Kowloon's Shun Lee Estate. 

Lai began working at television network TVB in 1983 as a clerk in the administration department. In 1985, he resigned from the position and enrolled in TVB's artistes training program. After completing the program, he joined TVB as an actor. He appeared in various Educational Television programs, in which he played supporting roles. He made his television series debut in the 1986 docu-drama Price of A Green Card. From 1986 to 1989, Lai played various roles and made appearances as an extra in over 50 drama series.

Lai portrayed Zhou Botong in four Jin Yong television adaptations, including Rage And Passion (1992), The Condor Heroes Return (1993), The Legend of the Condor Heroes 1994, and The Condor Heroes 95.

Lai gained popularity as Zhu Bajie in the commercial success Journey to the West. After starring in Anti-Crime Squad in 1999, he left TVB to pursue opportunities in the film industry. He appeared in the films Bio-Zombie (1998) and Happy Go Lucky (2003), and starred in a few ATV productions after joining the network for a year. 

In 2002, unable to earn a steady source of income from film projects, Lai returned to TVB. He starred in the television series Greed Mask, in which Lai portrays a transgender man. 

Lai won Best Supporting Actor at the 2008 TVB Anniversary Awards for his role in The Gentle Crackdown II. In 2008, Lai starred in Pages of Treasures, marking his first role as the male lead along with Paul Chun. His breakthrough year was 2009 when Lai portrayed Chai Kau in the critically acclaimed period drama Rosy Business, starring opposite Sheren Tang. His performance was met with overwhelming critical acclaim. Chai Kau became a Hong Kong pop culture icon and spawned the catchphrase "How many decades are in a lifetime?". At the 2009 TVB Anniversary Awards, Lai won Best Actor, My Favourite Male Character, and the TVB.com Popularity Award.

In 2010, Lai once again won Best Actor at the TVB Anniversary Awards for his role Lau Sing in the second installment of Rosy Business, No Regrets, becoming the second actor to win consecutive awards in this category after Gallen Lo who won in 1997 and 1998. Over the years, Lai continues to call the role of Lau Sing as his favourite among all the characters he has played and considers it his representative work. He has stated that No Regrets deeply affected him due to its patriotic theme and that the series is the best drama he has worked on. In 2011, Lai starred in the police procedural Forensic Heroes III as Pro Sir. In 2012, Lai starred as Li Lianying in the palace drama The Confidant. He won Best Actor for the third time at the 2012 TVB Anniversary Awards. 

In 2015, Lai made a guest appearance in the drama Master of Destiny, and starred in the period fantasy drama Under the Veil. He portrays Kung Siu San in Lord of Shanghai, starring alongside Anthony Wong and Kent Tong. Lai then starred in the period comedy Short End of the Stick, a series about the lives of eunuchs after the fall of the Qing dynasty. Lai starred in the sitcom Come Home Love: Dinner at 8. In 2016, he starred in a dual role portraying twins in the third installment of the Rosy Business franchise, No Reserve. In 2020, Lai starred in the action drama Death by Zero, portraying the role of an assassin.

Filmography

Film

Television dramas

Awards
2007: Astro Wah Lai Toi "My Favorite Show-Stealer Cast" award for Safe Guards
2007: Astro Wah Lai Toi "My Favourite Unforgettable Scene" award for Safe Guards
2008: 2008 TVB Anniversary Awards "Best Supporting Actor" award for The Gentle Crackdown II
2009: Mingpao Weekly – "Most Outstanding Actor" for Rosy Business
2009: TVB 42nd Anniversary "Best Actor" award for Rosy Business
2009: TVB 42nd Anniversary "TVB.com Popularity Award"
2009: TVB Anniversary Awards "My Favourite Male Character" "Rosy Business"
2009: Yahoo! Asia Buzz Awards "TV Actor"
2010: Next Magazine Top 10 TV Artiste No. 2
2010: TVB Anniversary Awards "Best Actor" award for No Regrets
2010: New York Television Festival "Best Performance – Talent Credits" for Rosy Business (Episode 7)
2011: Shanghai Television Festival nominated "Best Actor" for No Regrets
2011: Mingpao Weekly – "Most Outstanding Actor" for No Regrets

References

External links
Wayne Lai on Sina Weibo

 
|-
! colspan="3" style="background: #DAA520;" | TVB Anniversary Awards
|-

1964 births
Living people
Hong Kong male television actors
TVB veteran actors
20th-century Hong Kong male actors
21st-century Hong Kong male actors
Hong Kong male film actors
Hong Kong male comedians